Atin Cu Pung Singsing is a traditional Filipino folk song from Central Luzon, Philippines in Kapampangan sung by adults and children. The origin of the song is unknown, and there was a debate whether it was pre-historic or colonial. But its melody is most likely from the 18th century as it was similar to Spanish and Mexican folk songs of the era.
The folk song, it presents a woman as its main character and a man as a secondary character. The woman in the song was looking for a missing ring given by her mother and offers her love as a prize for the man who could find it.

In popular culture 
The folk song was interpreted by Filipino popular artists such as Lea Salonga in Ryan Cayabyab's Bahaghari album, Freddie Aguilar and Nora Aunor. It was also performed by different orchestras and brass bands.

In 1985, Filipino film Virgin Forest directed by Peque Gallaga, the folk song was sung by adventurers while sailing in the Pampanga River.

The popular Filipino children song Ako ay May Lobo (literally: "I have a Balloon") is sung in the same melody of the folk song.

References

Philippine folk songs
Songwriter unknown
Year of song unknown